Derek Lamar Brison (born March 7, 1986) is an Aruban footballer who plays for VV Oosterhout. He made a single appearance for the Aruba national team as a substitute.

National team statistics

References

External links

1986 births
Living people
Aruban footballers
Aruba international footballers
Association football forwards
SV Racing Club Aruba players